"Pick Up the Pieces" is a song by American recording artist Jason Derulo for his second studio album, Future History (2011). It was written by Derulo, Josh Walker, Olivia Waithe, Tiffany Fred, Michael McGregor, Peter King, Lee Monteverde and Kelly Sheehan. Production was handled by J.R. Rotem and JD Walker.

The song was released as one of four promotional singles for the album on September 9, 2011. It was later released as the album's sixth and final single in Australia on August 9, 2012, coinciding with the release of the platinum edition of Future History and Derulo's stint as a judge on the TV series Everybody Dance Now.

Charts

Release history

References

2012 singles
2011 songs
Jason Derulo songs
Songs written by Kelly Sheehan
Songs written by Livvi Franc
Songs written by Tiffany Red
Warner Records singles
Songs written by Jason Derulo
Song recordings produced by J. R. Rotem